Amy Schauer (2 June 1871– 13 August 1956) was an Australian cookery instructor and author.

Biography
Amy Schauer was born on 2 June 1871 in Sydney, New South Wales, Australia. After completing her schooling in New South Wales, she took training in domestic sciences at Sydney Technical College. She later joined the  Brisbane Technical College, and taught cookery from 1895 until 1922.

She also taught at Nambour Rural School. She, as Ryan claims, became “an outstanding influence on the education of Queensland girls.” Her recipes regularly appeared in magazines including Sapford's Queensland Almanac and the Queensland Farmer's Gazette.

She died at  Strathfield, Sydney, on 13 August 1956.

Publications
Her cookbooks were widely used in academic institutions as well as in homes. Her popular books include 
The Schauer Australian Cookery Book ,
Cookery for Invalids,
 Theory of Cookery, and
Schauer Australian Fruit Preserving and Confectionery.

References

 1871 births
 1956 deaths

Australian food writers
Women cookbook writers
Australian women educators